The 2015 ACBS Asian Snooker Championship was an amateur snooker tournament that took place from 23 April to 30 April 2015 in Kuala Lumpur, Malaysia  It was the 31st edition of the ACBS Asian Snooker Championship and also doubles as a qualification event for the World Snooker Tour.

The 23rd seed Hamza Akbar won the event by defeating former world number 56 Pankaj Advani 7–6 in the final. This was Akbar's first Asian Snooker Championship victory and as a result Akbar was given a two-year card on the professional World Snooker Tour for the 2015/2016 and 2016/2017 seasons.

Results

References

2015 in snooker
Snooker amateur tournaments
Sport in Kuala Lumpur
2015 in Malaysian sport
International sports competitions hosted by Malaysia